Korba may refer to:

Places
Korba, Chhattisgarh, a city in India
Korba district, an administrative district in India
Korba (Lok Sabha constituency)
Korba (Vidhan Sabha constituency)
Korba railway station
Korba, Estonia, Paide Parish, Järva County
Korba, Tunisia

Other uses
CS Korba, a football club based in Korba, Tunisia
Józef Korbas (1914–1981), Polish footballer
Korba (Dune), a character in the novel Dune Messiah by Frank Herbert

See also
Common Object Request Broker Architecture (CORBA)